Bahāʾ al‐Dīn Muḥammad ibn Ḥusayn al‐ʿĀmilī (18 February 1547 – 1 September 1621), also known as Bahāddīn ʿĀmilī, or just Sheikh Bahāʾi, was a Levantine Arab Shia Islamic scholar, poet, philosopher, architect, mathematician and astronomer, who lived in the late 16th and early 17th centuries in Safavid Iran. He was born in Baalbek, Ottoman Syria (present-day Lebanon) but immigrated in his childhood to Safavid Iran with the rest of his family.  He was one of the earliest astronomers in the Islamic world to suggest the possibility of the Earth's movement prior to the spread of the Copernican theory. He is considered one of the main co-founders of Isfahan School of Islamic Philosophy. In later years he became one of the teachers of Mulla Sadra.

He wrote over 100 treatises and books in different topics, in Arabic and Persian. A number of architectural and engineering designs are attributed to him, but none can be substantiated with sources. These may have included the Naqsh-e Jahan Square and Charbagh Avenue in Isfahan,. He is buried in Imam Reza shrine in Mashad in Iran.

Biography

Shaykh Baha' al-Din (also spelled Baha'uddin) Muhammad ibn Husayn al-'Amili was born near Baalbek, in Ottoman Syria (present-day Lebanon) in 1547. After the execution of al-Shahid al-Tani in 1558, his father's mentor, he and his family moved to the neighboring Safavid Empire; first to Isfahan, and from there to Qazvin, the then Iranian royal capital. At the time, the Safavid realm was ruled by king Tahmasp I (r. 1524-1576).  Tahmasp I appointed Shaykh Bahāʾī's father to serve as Shaykh al-Islām in several important Safavid cities in order to propagate Twelver Shi'ism amongst the population.

Shaykh Bahāʾī completed his studies in Isfahan. Having intended to travel to Mecca in 1570, he visited many Islamic countries including Iraq, Syria and Egypt and after spending four years there, he returned to Iran.

Shaykh Baha' al-Din died in 1621 in Isfahan. His body was buried in Mashhad according to his will.

Exact dates of birth and death
The exact dates of his birth and death are different on his grave stone and on the ceramic of the walls of the room where he is buried in. 

Date of birth:
On the ceramics of the wall: 27 February 1547
On the grave stone: March 1546

Date of death:
On the ceramics of the wall: 30 August 1621
On the grave stone: August 1622

The dates on the wall contain day, month and year, while the dates on the grave stone only contain month and year. The ceramics of the wall are made in 1945. It seems that at that time a research is performed about the exact dates, and, therefore, the information about the day is added to the dates.

Pen name
According to Baháʼí Faith scholar ‘Abdu’l-Hamíd Ishráq-Khávari, Shaykh Baha' al-Din adopted the pen name (takhallus) 'Baha' after being inspired by words of Shi'a Imam Muhammad al-Baqir (the fifth Imam) and Imam Ja'far al-Sadiq (the sixth Imam), who had stated that the Greatest Name of God was included in either Du'ay-i-Sahar or Du'ay-i-Umm-i-Davud. In the first verse of the Du'ay-i-Sahar, a dawn prayer for the Ramadan, the name "Bahá" appears four times: "Allahumma inni as 'aluka min Bahá' ika bi Abháh va kulla Bahá' ika Bahí".

Astronomy and mathematics

His interest in the sciences is also apparent by some of his works and treaties, although many of his astronomical treatises are yet to be studied. He probably have written 17 tracts and books on astronomy and related subjects. The following are some his works in astronomy:

 Risālah dar ḥall‐i ishkāl‐i ʿuṭārid wa qamar (Treatise on the problems of the Moon and Mercury), on attempting to solve inconsistencies of the Ptolemaic system within the context of Islamic astronomy.
 Tashrīḥ al‐aflāk (Anatomy of the celestial spheres), a summary of theoretical astronomy where he affirms the view that supports the positional rotation of the Earth. He was one of Islamic astronomers to advocate the feasibility of the Earth's rotation in the 16th century, independent of Western influences. 
 Kholasat al-Hesab (The summa of arithmetic) was translated into German by G. H. F. Nesselmann and was published as early as 1843.

Architecture 

Shaykh Baha' al-Din was known for his proficiency in mathematics, architecture and geometry. A number of architectural and engineering designs are attributed to him, but none can be substantiated with sources.

Shaykh Baha' al-Din is attributed with the architectural planning of the city of Isfahan during the Safavid era. He was the architect of Isfahan's Imam Square, Imam Mosque and Hessar Najaf. He also made a sun clock to the west of the Imam Mosque. 

He is also known for his mastery of topography. One instance of this is the directing of the water of the Zayandeh River to different areas of Isfahan. He designed a canal called the Zarrin Kamar in Isfahan which is considered one of Iran's greatest canals. He also determined the direction of Qiblah (prayer direction) from the Naghsh-e-Jahan Square.

He also designed and constructed a furnace for a public bathroom, which still exists in Isfahan, known as Sheikh Bahai's Bathhouse. It is said that the furnace was powered by a single candle which was placed in an enclosure, and that the candle burned for a long time, boiling the bath's water. It is also said that according to his own instructions, the candle's fire would be put out if the enclosure was ever opened. It is believed that this happened during the restoration and repair of the building and it was not possible to make the system work again. In fact, Sheikh Bahaei used flammable gases that were naturally produced in a nearby cesspool for heating the bath's water. In 1969-70, the bathroom heating system was excavated and a series of underground pipelines made of sun-dried clay were discovered. Although there are many theories about the working of this heating system, it was concluded recently that he knew about biogas and the network was to guide toilet wells which were common to Iranian's houses and mosques.
It is said that he designed the Manar Jonban (Shaking Minarets), which still exist in Isfahan; but this edifice was built in the fourteenth century during the Ilkhanid period on the tomb of Amu Abdollah Soqla, a pious Sheikh and Faqeer, who died in that same century.

The High Council of Cultural Revolution in Iran designated April 23 as the National Architect Day, marking the birth anniversary of Sheikh Bahaei.

Shia Jurisprudence

In the Twelver tradition, Shaykh Bahai is regarded as a leading scholar of his age and a mujaddid of the seventeenth century. His erudition won him the admiration of Shah Abbas, and he was appointed the Sheikh ul-Islam of Isfahan after the death of the previous incumbent. He composed works on tafsir, hadith, grammar and fiqh (jurisprudence).

Mysticism

Shaykh Baha' al-Din was also an adept of mysticism. He had a distinct Sufi leaning for which he was criticized by Mohammad Baqer Majlesi. During his travels he dressed like a Dervish and frequented Sufi circles. He also appears in the chain of both the Nurbakhshi and Ni'matullāhī Sufi orders. In the work called "Resāla fi’l-waḥda al-wojūdīya" (Exposition of the concept of Wahdat al-Wujud (Unity of Existences), he states that the Sufis are the true believers, calls for an unbiased assessment of their utterances, and refers to his own mystical experiences. Both his Persian and Arabic poetry is also replete with mystical allusions and symbols. At the same time, Shaykh Baha' al-Din calls for strict adherence to the Sharia as a prerequisite for embarking on the Tariqah and did not hold a high view of antinomian mysticism.

Works

Shaykh Baha' al-Din contributed numerous works in philosophy, logic, astronomy and mathematics. His works include over 100 articles, epistles and books. Shaykh Baha' al-Din also composed poems in Persian and Arabic. His outstanding works in the Persian language are Jāmi’-i Abbāsī and two masnavis (rhymed couplets) by the names of Shīr u Shakar ("Milk and Sugar") and Nān u Halwā ("Bread and Halva").

His other important work is the Kashkūl, which includes stories, news, scientific topics, Persian and Arabic proverbs.

He also wrote Khulāṣat al‐ḥisāb (lit. "Essentials of arithmetic"), an Arabic textbook that became popular throughout the Islamic world from Egypt to India until the 19th century. It was translated into German in Berlin by G. H. F. Nesselmann and published in 1843. A French translation appeared later 1854.

Other works
 Meklāt (in Arabic)
 Kashkūl (in Persian and Arabic)
 Tūtī-Nāmah (in Persian)
 Nān u Panīr (in Persian)
 Shīr u Shakar (in Persian)
 Nān u Halwā (in Persian and Arabic)
 Jāmi'-i Abbāsī (in Persian)
 Tashrīḥ Al-Aflāk (in Arabic)
 Al-fawayid as-Samadiah (in Arabic)
 Mashriq al-Shamsayn wa Iksīr al-Sa'adatayn (in Arabic)
 Al-Athnā' Ash'ariyyah (in Arabic)
 Zubdat al-Usūl (in Arabic)

See also
 Sheikhbahaee University in Isfahan, which was named in his honor.

Notes

References
 
  (PDF version)

External links 

Biography
Menar-e-Jonban
Legend of bathhouse powered by single candle for centuries

1547 births
1621 deaths
16th-century Iranian  astronomers
17th-century Iranian  astronomers
Emigrants from the Ottoman Empire to Iran
Safavid theologians
Burials in Iran
16th-century Iranian mathematicians
16th-century architects
17th-century Iranian mathematicians
17th-century architects
People from Baalbek
16th-century Iranian philosophers
Iranian architects
16th-century Muslim scholars of Islam
17th-century Muslim scholars of Islam
16th-century writers of Safavid Iran
17th-century writers of Safavid Iran
16th-century Arabs
17th-century Arabs
Burials in Mashhad
Burials at Imam Reza Shrine